Maidscross Hill is a  biological Site of Special Scientific Interest on the eastern outskirts of Lakenheath in Suffolk. It is a Nature Conservation Review site, Grade I, and larger area of 49.8 hectares is a Local Nature Reserve.

This very dry grassland has four nationally rare plants, Breckland wild thyme, Spanish catchfly, grape hyacinth and sickle medick. The site is not grazed, which has allowed invasion by bracken and scrub, but also increased the nesting sites for birds.

There is access from Broom Road and Maids Cross Hill.

References

Sites of Special Scientific Interest in Suffolk
Nature Conservation Review sites
Lakenheath